Dunkeld market cross (colloquially Dunkeld mercat cross, also known as the Atholl Memorial Fountain), in the Scottish town of Dunkeld, Perth and Kinross, is in the form of a drinking fountain. A Category B listed structure in the care of the National Trust for Scotland, it was designed by C. S. Robertson and erected in 1866 as a monument to the George Murray, 6th Duke of Atholl.

The fountain stands in a triangular plot between The Cross (to the north and west) and High Street (to the south and east).

Buildings
Buildings in The Cross and High Street triangle include:

The Duchess Anne
The Ell Shop
Perth Arms Hotel

Gallery

See also
 List of listed buildings in Dunkeld And Dowally, Perth and Kinross

References

Listed buildings in Dunkeld
Category B listed buildings in Perth and Kinross
Monumental crosses in Scotland
1866 establishments in Scotland
National Trust for Scotland properties